The Buru white-eye (Zosterops buruensis) is a species of bird in the family Zosteropidae. It is endemic to Indonesian islands, including the island of Buru which gives its name. Its natural habitats are subtropical or tropical moist lowland forests and subtropical or tropical moist montane forests. The species occupy an area of larger than 20,000 km2 and is thought to have a stable population of above 10,000, and thus are not considered as threatened.

References

Buru white-eye
Birds of Buru
Buru white-eye
Taxonomy articles created by Polbot